Charles Robert Reynolds (born October 5, 1946) is a former American football center who played two seasons with the Cleveland Browns of the National Football League (NFL). He was drafted by the Cleveland Browns in the eighth round of the 1969 NFL Draft. He first enrolled at Texas Christian University before transferring to the University of Tulsa. Reynolds attended Arlington Heights High School in Fort Worth, Texas. He is pastor of Grace Baptist Church in Abilene, Texas.

References

External links
Just Sports Stats
Pro Football Reference

Living people
1946 births
Players of American football from Fort Worth, Texas
American football centers
TCU Horned Frogs football players
Tulsa Golden Hurricane football players
Cleveland Browns players